Miss Republic of the Congo or Miss Congo (RC) is a national beauty pageant responsible selecting Congo'lese for ambassador of the country. In 2006 the country participated at the Miss International competition in China.

Titleholders
Color key

The winner of Miss Congo (RC) might compete at the Miss International or Miss Tourism Queen International if held.

(*) Miss Republic of the Congo 2008, Fatouma Eboundit is the first representative who placed in the 2nd Runner-up of "Miss Tourism Queen International 2006" in China.

See also
Miss Congo (RDC)

References 

Republic of the Congo
Recurring events established in 2005